The Hangman (German:Der Henker or Der Staatsanwalt klagt an) is a 1928 German silent film directed by Theodor Sparkuhl and Adolf Trotz and starring Andrée Lafayette, Bernhard Goetzke and Fritz Kampers.

The film's art direction was by Victor Trivas.

Cast
 Andrée Lafayette as Barfrau  
 Bernhard Goetzke as Prosecutor
 Fritz Kampers as Bösewicht  
 Max Landa as Lawyer
 Georg John 
 Anna von Palen
 Robert Garrison
 Antonie Jaeckel as Wirtschafterin 
 Irm Cherry 
 Félix de Pomés

References

Bibliography
 Alfred Krautz (ed.). Encyclopedia of film directors in the United States of America and Europe, Volume 2. Saur, 1997.

External links

1928 films
Films of the Weimar Republic
Films directed by Adolf Trotz
German silent feature films
German black-and-white films